Torpshammar is a locality situated in Ånge Municipality, Västernorrland County, Sweden with 444 inhabitants in 2010. It was founded in 1797 as an iron milling community. It is known for being home to the first location of Boda Borg.

Climate
Torpshammar has traditionally had a subarctic climate, although due to recent warming it is transitioning to a humid continental climate with four distinct seasons, cold winters and warm but short summers.

References 

Populated places in Ånge Municipality
Medelpad